Simon Berger  may refer to:

Simon Berger (artist) (born 1976), Swiss artist
Simon J. Berger (born 1979), Swedish actor
Simon Berger, Australian media person involved in Alan Jones "died of shame" controversy